The Terrace is a 1963 Argentine drama film directed by Leopoldo Torre Nilsson and starring Graciela Borges, Leonardo Favio, Marcela López Rey and Héctor Pellegrini. It was entered into the 13th Berlin International Film Festival.

Cast
 Graciela Borges – Claudia
 Leonardo Favio – Rodolfo
 Marcela López Rey – Vicky
 Héctor Pellegrini – Alberto
 Dora Baret – Valeria
 Norberto Suárez – Luis
 Enrique Liporace – Horacio
 Luis Walmo – Pablo
 Mirtha Dabner – Mercedes
 Óscar Caballero – Guille
 Belita – Herself
 Susana Brunetti – Cuban woman
 Bernardo Kullock – Gaspar
 Fernando Vegal – Father Alfonso
 Maria Esther Duckse – Grandmother
 Alfredo Tobares – Alberto's Father

References

External links

1963 films
1963 drama films
Argentine drama films
Argentine black-and-white films
1960s Spanish-language films
Films directed by Leopoldo Torre Nilsson
1960s Argentine films